Radermachera is a genus of about 17 species of flowering plants in the family Bignoniaceae, native to southeastern Asia. They are evergreen trees reaching 5–40 m tall, with bipinnate or tripinnate leaves, and panicles of large bell-shaped, white, pink, pale purple or yellow flowers 5–7 cm diameter.

The genus is named after Jacob Cornelis Matthieu Radermacher, the 18th century Dutch naturalist who cataloged much of the flora of Java and Sumatra.

Species
, Plants of the World Online recognises 17 accepted species:
Radermachera boniana 
Radermachera coriacea 
Radermachera eberhardtii 
Radermachera frondosa 
Radermachera gigantea 
Radermachera glandulosa 
Radermachera hainanensis 
Radermachera inflata 
Radermachera microcalyx 
Radermachera peninsularis 
Radermachera pentandra 
Radermachera quadripinnata 
Radermachera ramiflora 
Radermachera sinica 
Radermachera stellata 
Radermachera xylocarpa 
Radermachera yunnanensis

Cultivation and uses
Radermachera sinica has become a popular houseplant, grown for its decorative foliage.

Radermachera sp. 'Kunming' sold under the tradename 'Summerscent' is a fast growing, scented, trending plant in Australia. Useful as an informal screen (pruning aggressively after flowering) or a small tree if trained to a single trunk (cinture before flowering to maximise flower production and reduce crown after flowering).

References

Flora of China: Radermachera
Flora of Thailand: Radermachera species list
Radermachera eberhardtii (Bignoniaceae), a new record for Thailand Thai Forest. Bull. (Bot.) 31: 129–131. 2003 (pdf file).

 
Bignoniaceae genera
Taxa named by Heinrich Zollinger
Taxa named by Alexander Moritzi